Bijan Samandar (June 1, 1941 – January 8, 2019) (Persian: بیژن سمندر)  was a prominent Iranian contemporary poet, lyricist and Tar player who has written lyrics for notable artists including Ebi, Dariush, Sattar, Vigen, Moein, Mahasti, Shahram Shabpareh, Andy, Homeyra, Morteza, Hassan Shamaizadeh, and many more.

Life
Born in Shiraz in 1941, he studied architecture in the United States and for a while worked with the Iranian Embassy in Washington DC. In the 1970s, he returned to Tehran and worked with the national TV. After 1979 revolution Samandar moved to California.

Died on January 6, 2019, after a long battle with Parkinson's disease being cared for in a residential care facility in Santa Monica, CA.

Work
Samandar tar albums have been released in the United States in 1970s as LP. Later in Tehran and Los Angeles his lyrics have been performed by most famous Persian singers such as Hayedeh, Mahasti, Ebi, Martik and Moein.

A collection of his poems is published in Shiraz entitled "Shiraz-e Az Gol Beytaru".

References
 Music of Iran: Bijan Samandar, Tar

External links
 Bijan Samandar in 1985 Persian New Year Show (Video)

1941 births
2019 deaths
Persian-language poets
Iranian male poets
Iranian lyricists
People from Shiraz
Exiles of the Iranian Revolution in the United States
20th-century poets
Iranian emigrants to the United States
People with Parkinson's disease